The 3rd Pointe-Au-Père Lighthouse was built in 1909 in the city of Pointe-au-Père, near Rimouski, Quebec, Canada. This city was well known in naval circles as the location of the pilot station for the Bas-Saint-Laurent (lower St. Lawrence) zone. Pointe-au-Père has since been amalgamated into the larger city of Rimouski (2002).

It is built in a characteristic shape, employing eight concrete buttresses to support a slender central cylinder.

It was replaced by an electronic lighthouse in 1975 and the site is now open for visitors as part of the Site historique maritime de la Pointe-au-Père. The RMS Empress of Ireland shipwrecking is documented in the Empress of Ireland museum and you can also visit the first submarine open to the public in Canada, .

The site was designated a National Historic Site in 1974, and is considered a unit of the national park system. However, visitor services are provided by the non-profit Point-au-Père Maritime Historic Site.

Keepers
 David Lawson 1859-1876
 John McWilliams 1876-1893
 John McWilliams 1893-1911
 John Cahill 1912-1920
 Thomas Matthew Wyatt 1920-1936
 Charles Augustus Lavoie 1936-1964
 Roger St. Pierre Lavoie 1964-1972
 Armand Lafrance 1972-?

See also
List of lighthouses in Canada
Henri de Miffonis

References

External links
 Aids to Navigation Canadian Coast Guard
 Site historique maritime de la Pointe-au-Père

Lighthouses completed in 1909
Lighthouses in Quebec
Buildings and structures in Rimouski
National Historic Sites in Quebec
Lighthouse museums in Canada
Tourist attractions in Bas-Saint-Laurent
Lighthouses on the National Historic Sites of Canada register
Site historique maritime de la Pointe-au-Père
1909 establishments in Quebec